A French Metropolitan Decree, dated 12 March 1880 adopted a six-year term of office for Mayors (Maire), municipal councillors (Conseil municipaux) and commune panchayats (communes). Thus French India has seen a French system of municipal administration. In the past, municipal administration was virtually the pivot of the whole administrative machinery in French India. It had several features that could serve as a role model for hassle-free administration.

Then a total of 10 communes were formed in which Yanaon became one commune with a strength of 12 Municipal Councillors (conseillers municipaux). First elections were held on 30 May 1880.  The 26 January 1974 Commune Panchayat Act provides for a two tier system of Panchayat administration, one at the Village level and the other at the Commune level. The Mayors and Deputy mayors ceased to function with effect from that date. All the executive powers of the Mayors stood transferred to the Commissioners appointed under these Acts.

Present Chairman and Vice-chairman of Yanam Municipal Council was Gidla Chandra Rao and Pendem Surya Prakash.

List of Mayors
French commune (1880–1954)
BEZAWADA Bapanaya Naidou (1880–1883)
PAINDICONDALA Subbaya (1883–1885)
BEZAWADA Bapanaya Naidou (1885–1886)
SAMATAM Venkatasubbaraidu (1886)
BEZAWADA Bapanaya Naidou (1886–1891)
KONA Narasaya (1891–1897)
...(1897–1903)
BEZAWADA Bapanaya Naidou (1903–1912)
BEZAWADA Bapa Naidou (1925–1931)
KAMICHETTY Venougopala Rao Naidou (1931–1937)
...(1937–1948)
MADIMCHETTY Satianandam (1948–1954)
SAMATAM Kistaya (1954)
Indian municipality (1954–1974)
CAMIDI Vincanna (c.1961-c.1964)
KAMICHETTY Savithri (c.1964-c.1967)

List of Municipal Chairpersons
Gidla Chandra Rao (2006-till date)

See also
Yanam Municipality
 Municipal Administration in French India
 Pondicherry Municipality

References

External links
Official District website of Yanam
Future of French India, by Russel H. Fifield (Associate Professor of Political Science at University of Michigan
Pravasandhrulu in France: identity and integration by Jonnalagadda Anuradha, France
Official website of the Government of the Union Territory of Puducherry
Indian Ministry for External Affairs - 1956 Treaty of Cession
THE FRENCH AND PORTUGUESE SETTLEMENTS IN INDIA

Local government in Puducherry
Yanam

Puducherry district councillors